John Marik Makur Lenpiny is a South Sudanese politician, belonging to the Sudan People's Liberation Movement. In 2010, he was elected to the Lakes State Legislative Assembly as a candidate on the SPLM party list. As of 2012, he serves as the speaker of the Lakes State Legislative Assembly.

References

Living people
Sudan People's Liberation Movement politicians
Year of birth missing (living people)
People from Lakes (state)
Members of the Lakes State Legislative Assembly